High Chicago (also released as A Family Man) is a 2011 drama film. Director Alfons Adetuyi and his brother, screenwriter Robert Adetuyi, used locations in their home town of Sudbury, Ontario when making the film.

The film had its US premier at the 2012 Pan African Film Festival in February 2012. It had its Toronto premier at the 2012 ReelWorld Film Festival in April 2012. In an interview in Shadow and Act magazine Adetuyi revealed that his film about a father with a dream was based on one of his own father's dreams. His father had dreamed of opening a North American style drive-in movie theatre in Africa.

The film was Adetuyi's first feature film, although he and his brothers had run a film production company, Inner City Films, for over a decade.
Angelo Muredda praised the film for an absence of the mistakes beginning directors usually make on their debut feature films.

Adetuyi told the Sudbury Star shortly after the release of High Chicago that he planned to return to Sudbury to shoot a second film, as he saw High Chicago as the first in an "African trilogy".

Plot

Colin Salmon stars as Sam, a hard-drinking father of three, ex-Navy man, ex-miner, and soon to be ex-husband. Sam takes to gambling to bankroll his crazy plan to open a drive-in theatre in Africa.  Equally desperate to support his family and keep his dream alive, we watch as Sam’s life spirals out of control in a showdown with a deadly Detroit card shark.

Festivals

Montreal International Black Film Festival, 2012
Chicago Black Harvest Film Festival, 2012 
Boston Roxbury International Film Festival, 2012
Canadian Cinema Editors Awards, 2012 - Nomination - "Best Editing - Feature Length Dramatic"
ReelWorld Film Festival, 2012 - Awards - "Outstanding Canadian Feature" and "Audience Choice Award"
African Movie Academy Awards (AMAA), 2012 - Nomination - "Best Diaspora Feature"
Los Angeles Pan African Film Festival, 2012 - Nomination - "Best Director First Feature"
Cinéfest Sudbury International Film Festival, 2011

References

External links
 

2011 films
Films shot in Greater Sudbury
Canadian drama films
English-language Canadian films
Films directed by Alfons Adetuyi
2010s Canadian films